Stepan Center is a multi-purpose geodesic dome built in 1962 at the University of Notre Dame, and is located on the northeast corner of campus. The $350,000 to build Stepan Center was donated to the university by Alfred Stepan, the founder of Stepan Company, and his wife, Mary Louise.   The facility, which was one of the first geodesic dome built in the United States, has  of floor space. With its brick base, gold-anodized aluminum dome and silver ceiling, the center attracted widespread attention at its opening, according to a 2022 Notre Dame Magazine article.
On October 18, 1963 Martin Luther King Jr. spoke at Stepan Center, in an event organized the South Bend Citizens’ Civic Planning Committee as a fundraiser for the Southern Christian Leadership Conference. King spoke about the problems of segregation, discrimination, and the civil right movement. The event, arranged by Theodore Hesburgh, was at the venue's s capacity and attracted a racially mixed crowd estimated at 3,000 to 3,500 people.
As of spring 2022, Stepan Center was still being heavily used for Notre Dame student events and the university had invested in repairs to its roof, installed new windows and made other improvements to assure its continued use.

References

External links

Geodesic domes
University and college buildings completed in 1962
University of Notre Dame buildings and structures